The Communities Directorates are a group of civil service Directorates in the Scottish Government. The individual Directorates within the overarching Communities Directorates report to the Director-General, Paul Johnston.

History
The Governance and Communities Directorates were created by a December 2010 re-organisation, with Paul Gray appointed as the Director-General. In June 2014, Sarah Davidson was appointed as Director-General, with the group of Directorates now simply referred to as "Communities".

Ministers 
There is no direct relationship between Ministers and the Directorates. However, in general, the activities of the Directorates include those under the purview of the Cabinet Secretary for Social Justice, Housing and Local Government, Shona Robison MSP. She is assisted in this work by the Minister for Equalities and Older People and the Minister for Social Security and Local Government.

Directorates
The overarching Scottish Government Directorates were preceded by similar structures called "Departments" that no longer exist (although the word is still sometimes used in this context). As an overarching unit, the  Communities Directorates incorporate a number of individual Directorates entitled:

 Equality, Inclusion and Human Rights - Director: 
 Housing and Social Justice - Director: Shirley Laing
 Local Government and Communities - Director: Stephen Gallagher
 Social Security - Director: Stephen Kerr

The individual Directorates are headed by Directors who are assisted by Deputy Directors.

References

External links
 Directorates on Scottish Government website

Directorates of the Scottish Government
Architecture in Scotland
Town and country planning in Scotland
Science and technology in Scotland
Foreign relations of Scotland
Constitution of the United Kingdom
Local government in Scotland
Housing in Scotland
Scottish culture
Sport in Scotland
Environment of Scotland
Legal organisations based in Scotland
2010 establishments in Scotland
Government agencies established in 2010
Public housing in Scotland